Nottingham Girls' Academy (formerly Manning Comprehensive School) is a girls' secondary school and sixth form with academy status, located in the Aspley area of Nottingham in the English county of Nottinghamshire.

Previously a community school administered by Nottingham City Council, Manning Comprehensive School converted to academy status on 1 September 2011 and was renamed Nottingham Girls' Academy. The school is sponsored by the Greenwood Dale Foundation Trust, however Nottingham Girls' Academy continues to coordinate with Nottingham City Council for admissions.

Nottingham Girls' Academy offers GCSEs and BTECs as programmes of study for pupils, while students in the sixth form have the option to study from a range of A Levels and further BTECs.

Alumni
Notable alumni are categorised from the school's former names.

Peveril Bilateral School
 Su Pollard, actress

Brincliffe Grammar School for Girls
 Enid Bakewell, cricketer
 Sue Clifford, founder of Common Ground, known for Apple Day
 Dame Laura Knight, artist during World War II

References

External links
 Nottingham Girls' Academy official website

Secondary schools in Nottingham
Girls' schools in Nottinghamshire
Academies in Nottingham